Minitex is a publicly supported information and resource sharing program for academic, government, public and specialized libraries in the states of Minnesota, North Dakota, South Dakota, and with partners in Wisconsin and Iowa.  Minitex was created as a pilot project, initially funded in 1968 through a grant from the Louis and Maude Hill Foundation and state and federal grant funds from the Minnesota State Department of Education.

Today the system is a joint effort of the Minnesota Office of Higher Education and the University of Minnesota Libraries. Minitex is funded by the Minnesota State Legislature to serve higher education communities, and it also provides services for public, school, and specialized libraries in Minnesota through contracts with the Minnesota Department of Education.

The purpose of Minitex is to enhance library effectiveness by expanding information resources for libraries and providing services to their patrons. Minitex offers access to training, workshops, conferences, and events for the library and education community.

Minitex Services  
Libraries and their patrons can access a number of different services and information resources. These components include the MNLINK, ELM, Minnesota Digital Library, Ebooks Minnesota, AskMN, and the Minnesota Library Access Center.

The MNLINK system allows user to request materials from one of 600 participating Minnesota libraries to be shared. The Electronic Library for Minnesota is a collection of statewide research and information databases that users can query for research purposes. Ebooks Minnesota provides a publicly available collection of ebooks. In addition, the Minitex system links library loans from the University of Minnesota Library collection, other participating libraries, and other resource sharing services Other shared resources that can be accessed through the Minitex system include the Minnesota Digital Library, a digital library of Minnesota-specific content, and the Minnesota Library Access Center, a storage facility for collections from 21 Libraries

References

External links

Minnesota Office of Higher Education Minitex

OCLC
Library consortia in Minnesota
Library consortia in North Dakota
Library consortia in South Dakota
Library consortia in Wisconsin
Library consortia in Iowa
Library consortia with members in multiple states